Megatech is a Bermuda-registered company that pursued the development of various supercars. It is jointly owned by Hutomo (Tommy) Mandala Putra, the youngest son of President Suharto of Indonesia, and Mycom Setdco, a Bermuda-based subsidiary of Mycom Bhd.

Models
 Vector M12
 Vector SRV8

References

External links
Automotive Company in Indonesia

Offshore companies of Bermuda
Car manufacturers of Indonesia